St. Anne's Column stands in the city centre of Innsbruck on Maria-Theresien-Straße.

It was given its name when, in 1703, the last Bavarian troops were driven from the Tyrol on St. Anne's Day (26 July), as part of the War of the Spanish Succession. In 1704, in gratitude, the Landstände vowed to build a monument commemorating the event.

The column was made by Trient sculptor, Cristoforo Benedetti, from red Kramsach marble. On the base are four statues of saints:
 in the north, Saint Anne, the mother of the Blessed Virgin Mary
 in the west, Cassian, patron saint of the Diocese of Bozen-Brixen.
 in the east, Vigilius, patron saint of the Diocese of Trient.
 in the south, Saint George, patron saint of the Tyrol.
Towering above these four statues is the column with its statue of Mary as the Woman of the Apocalypse, raising 42 meters (137 feet) from the street.

The column was consecrated on 26 July 1706 by Prince-Bishop Kaspar Ignaz, Count of Künigl. It has been restored several times over the centuries. In 1958, mainly for conservation reasons, the figure of Mary was replaced by a replica and the original was loaned to the Abbey of St. Georgenberg-Fiecht, where it has been placed in a side chapel of the abbey church of Fiecht (near Schwaz) above Saint Mary's altar.

On 10 October 2009 the figures of saints on the base of the monument were also substituted; the originals are now on the first floor of the Altes Landhaus in Innsbruck.

See also 
 Bavarian Rummel

References

External links 

Sculptures of saints
18th-century sculptures
Marble sculptures in Austria
Monuments and memorials in Austria
Monumental columns in Austria
Tyrolean culture
Buildings and structures in Innsbruck